Nadezhda Petrovna Lamanova (27 December [O.S. 14 December] 1861 - 14 October 1941) was a Russian and Soviet fashion and costume designer.

Career
Until the Russian Revolution, Lamanova held a title of supplier of Her Majesty's Imperial Court. Lamanova created gowns for the Empress Alexandra Feodorovna. After the Revolution, Lamanova was the only renowned designer to stay in Russia and lay the basis for the new Soviet fashion. In cooperation with Russian artist and sculptor Vera Mukhina Lamanova won the Grand-prix at the International Exposition of 1925 in Paris.

References
 

1861 births
1941 deaths
Russian fashion designers
Russian women fashion designers
Burials at Vagankovo Cemetery
Businesspeople from the Russian Empire